Karl Gustav Mathias Franzén (born 22 February 1975) is a Swedish handball player who competed in the 2000 Summer Olympics.

He was born in Vreta Kloster, Linköping Municipality.

In 2000 he was a member of the Swedish handball team won the silver medal in the Olympic tournament. He played five matches and scored 25 goals.

External links
profile

1971 births
Living people
Swedish male handball players
Olympic handball players of Sweden
Handball players at the 2000 Summer Olympics
Olympic silver medalists for Sweden
Swedish expatriate sportspeople in Spain
Olympic medalists in handball
Medalists at the 2000 Summer Olympics
Redbergslids IK players